The 2007–08 UMBC Retrievers men's basketball team represented University of Maryland, Baltimore County in the 2007–08 NCAA Division I men's basketball season.

Schedule and results 

|-
!colspan=12 style=| Non-conference regular season

|-
!colspan=9 style=| America East regular season

|-
!colspan=12 style=| America East tournament
|-
  
  
|-

|-
!colspan=9 style=| NCAA tournament

|}

References

Umbc
UMBC Retrievers men's basketball seasons
UMBC
UMBC
UMBC